Coleby is a surname. Notable people with the surname include:

 A. E. Coleby (1876–1930), British film director, actor and screenwriter
 Anja Coleby (born 1971),  Australian model, television actress, reporter and producer
 Conrad Coleby (born 1979), Australian actor and photographer
 Kadeem Coleby (born 1989), Bahamian basketball player
 Robert Coleby (born 1947), Australian actor
 Simon Coleby (born 1967), British comic book artist

See also
 Coleby, North Kesteven, near Lincoln
 Coleby, North Lincolnshire, near Scunthorpe
 Coleby Lombardo (born 1978), former child actor
 RAF Coleby Grange, air force base